Roger Marcellus Bobb is the President and CEO of Bobbcat Films, a film and television production company based in Atlanta, Georgia. Prior to creating Bobbcat films, Bobb served as the Executive Vice President of Tyler Perry Studios.

Bobb has won seven NAACP Image Awards and has produced 11 Tyler Perry films grossing over half a billion dollars. He has produced over 600 television sitcom episodes in his career such as House of Payne (TBS), Meet the Browns (TBS), The Rickey Smiley Show (TV One), Last Call (Bounce TV) and Mann & Wife (Bounce TV). Bobb also produced and directed the television movies Cooking Up Christmas (OWN), Holiday Heist (BET), Friend Request (BET), Raising Izzie (UP), In the Meantime (UP), Girlfriends Getaway (TV One) and Girlfriends Getaway 2 (TV One). He is a former DGA Trainee. He attended Brooklyn College and the School of Visual Arts.

Early life
Bobb was born in Balham, London, England of Guyanese parents.

Awards and recognition

Bobb been nominated for nine and has won seven NAACP Image awards: five for producing the sitcom Tyler Perry's House of Payne, one for producing the film For Colored Girls and one for producing the series It's a Mann's World. He is the recipient of the Caribbean American Movers and Shakers Awards, for his work in the film industry.

Filmography
Cop Land (1997)
Preaching to the Choir (2005)
State Property 2 (2005)
Diary of a Mad Black Woman (2005)
Madea's Family Reunion (2006)
Tyler Perry's House of Payne (TV series) (2006; TV)
Daddy's Little Girls (2007)
Why Did I Get Married? (2007)
Meet the Browns (2008)
The Family That Preys (2008)
Madea Goes to Jail (2009)
I Can Do Bad All By Myself (2009)
Why Did I Get Married Too? (2010)
For Colored Girls Who Have Considered Suicide When the Rainbow Is Enuf (2010)
Madea's Big Happy Family (2011)
Raising Izzie (2012)
Let the Church Say Amen (2012)
Girlfriends Getaway (2014)
Girlfriends Getaway 2 (2015)
Bad Dad Rehab (2016)
Life-Size 2 (2018)
Holiday Heist (2019)
Same Time Next Christmas (2019)
Friend Request (2020)
Steppin' Back to Love (2020)
The Thing About Harry (2020)
Open (2020)
Alieu the Dreamer (2020)
Cooking Up Christmas (2020)
A Chestnut Family Christmas (2021)
A Christmas Stray (2021)

Television
New York Undercover
NYPD Blue
Tyler Perry's House of Payne
Meet the Browns
The Battle (season 2)
The Rickey Smiley Show
It's a Mann's World
Mann & Wife
Rickey Smiley For Real
Last Call
Reasonable Doubt

References

External links

 Bobbcatfilms.com

American television producers
1966 births
American people of Guyanese descent
Living people